Dragan Petrović (born 17 December 1961) is a Serbian actor. He has appeared in more than seventy films since 1978. He teaches at the University of Arts in Belgrade.

Selected filmography
Andrija i Andjelka 2016 kao Zvonko Trtić - Zvonce

References

External links 

1961 births
Living people
Male actors from Belgrade
Serbian male film actors